Šestdobe is a village in the Municipality of Rače–Fram in northeastern Slovenia.

History
In the past, Šestdobe was part of the settlement of Ranče. It was established as an autonomous settlement in February 2013.

References

External links 
Šestdobe at Geopedia

Populated places in the Municipality of Rače-Fram
2013 establishments in Slovenia